Wu Sung-pei is a Taiwanese businessman and politician.

Wu attended Pacific Western University in Hawaii. He was a three-term member of the Central Standing Committee of the Kuomintang, serving on its fourteen, fifteen and sixteenth convocations. At the time of his designation as a Kuomintang candidate for the Legislative Yuan, representing overseas Chinese, Wu was based in South Africa. He was a member of the delegation that participated in the 2005 Pan–Blue visits to mainland China.

References

Year of birth missing (living people)
21st-century Taiwanese businesspeople
Taiwanese expatriates in the United States
Taiwanese expatriates in South Africa
Party List Members of the Legislative Yuan
Kuomintang Members of the Legislative Yuan in Taiwan
Members of the 6th Legislative Yuan
Living people